The Artega are an Arab tribe in Sudan. They came from Hadramut around eight centuries ago, settling near Tokar. The name is said to mean "patrician."

They became princes Sawakin since 664 AH under Mamluk and the Othman Caliphate. They were all followers of the Mahdi and Khalifa in the Mahdist War (1883-1898).

References

Ethnic groups in Sudan
Hadhrami people
Sudanese people of Yemeni descent
Arabs in Sudan
Tribes of Sudan